Rocky "R.J." Simpson is a Canadian politician, who was elected to the Legislative Assembly of the Northwest Territories in the 2015 election. He represents the electoral district of Hay River North.

He was returned to office in the 2019 Northwest Territories general election by acclamation, as no candidates filed to run against him by the close of nominations. Before the election, he announced that he would put his name forward for Premier of the Northwest Territories when the newly elected MLAs met to select the premier and cabinet. Simpson was elected to Premier Caroline Cochrane's cabinet committee by the new territorial MLAs on October 24, 2019. His cabinet portfolio includes Minister of Education, Culture and Employment, Minister Responsible for the Public Utilities Board, and Government House Leader.

RJ Simpson's father, Rocky Simpson, was also elected to the 19th Assembly as representative for Hay River South.

References 

Living people
Members of the Legislative Assembly of the Northwest Territories
21st-century Canadian politicians
Year of birth missing (living people)
People from Hay River